Kulemtsa is a rural locality (a selo) in Levashinsky District, Republic of Dagestan, Russia. The population was 2,174 as of 2010. There are 5 streets.

Geography 
Kulemtsa is located 22 km northwest of Levashi (the district's administrative centre) by road, on the Nakhatar River. Okhli and Akhkent are the nearest rural localities.

Nationalities 
Avars live there.

References 

Rural localities in Levashinsky District